Chrysoteuchia pseudodiplogrammus is a moth in the family Crambidae. It was described by Okano in 1962. It is found in Russia and Japan.

References

Crambini
Moths described in 1962
Moths of Asia
Moths of Japan